The 2010 European Individual Speedway Junior Championship is the 13th edition of the UEM Individual Speedway Junior European Championship. The Final took place on 24 July 2010 in Goričan, Croatia. The champion title was won by Dennis Andersson from Sweden who beat two Poles Przemysław Pawlicki and Patryk Dudek in Run-off. Pawlicki was a defending champion. It was first champion title for Sweden since 2004, when Antonio Lindbäck won at Rybnik, Poland. It was second final in Goričan; in 2006 won host rider Jurica Pavlič. In 2010 the only Croatian rider, Dino Kovacic, finished fourth.

Semi-finals

The Final 
 24 July 2010
  Goričan, Međimurje County
Stadium Milenium (Length: 305 m)
Referee:  Frank Ziegler
Jury President:  B.F. Thomsen
References 

Heat after heat:
 (59.40) Pawlicki, Andersson, Holub, Tirsdal
 (59.93) Jensen, Cyran, Gomólski, Bielousow
 (61.54) Pulczyński, Musielak, Andersen, Kobrin
 (60.39) Dudek, Kovacic, Karaczincew, Lahti
 (60.34) Dudek, Gomólski, Holub, Kobrin (F)
 (60.92) Pawlicki, Musielak, Karaczincew, Cyran (Fx)
 (62.21) Andersson, Kovacic, Jensen, Andersen
 (61.73) Pulczyński, Bielousow, Lahti, Tirsdal
 (62.25) Lahti, Holub, Cyran, Andersen (F)
 (61.51) Pawlicki, Kovacic, Pulczyński, Gomólski
 (61.64) Andersson, Bielousow, Karaczincew, Kobrin (R)
 (61.64) Dudek, Jensen, Musielak, Tirsdal
 (61.59) Pulczyński, Jensen, Karaczincew, Holub
 (60.93) Dudek, Pawlicki, Bielousow, Andersen
 (61.79) Andersson, Musielak, Gomólski, Lahti
 (62.50) Kovacic, Cyran, Tirsdal, Kobrin
 (63.46) Bielousow, Kovacic, Musielak, Holub
 (62.02) Pawlicki, Jensen, Lahti, Kobrin (R2)
 (61.04) Andersson, Dudek, Cyran, Pulczyński
 (69.03) Andersen, Lukaszewski, Gomólski (Fx), Karaczincew (N), Tirsdal (Fx)
 Medal's run-off:
 (?) Andersson, Pawlicki, Dudek

See also 
 2010 Team Speedway Junior European Championship
 2010 Individual Speedway European Championship

References 

2010
European Individual Junior